Kalpohin is a community in Tamale Metropolitan District in the Northern Region of Ghana.

Institutions 

 Kalpohin Senior High School
 Kalpohin Anglican

Notable native 

 Ramatu Aliu Mahama

See also
Suburbs of Tamale (Ghana) metropolis

References 

Communities in Ghana
Suburbs of Tamale, Ghana